Braura is a genus of moths in the family Lasiocampidae first described by Francis Walker in 1865.

External links

Lasiocampidae